Ian Don Marter (28 October 194428 October 1986) was an English actor and writer, known for his role as Harry Sullivan in the BBC science-fiction television series Doctor Who from December 1974 to September 1975, with a non-regular, one-serial return in November and December 1975. He sometimes used the pseudonym Ian Don. Marter died suddenly of a diabetic heart attack on his 42nd birthday in 1986.

Early life
Born in Warwickshire, the son of Donald Marter and his wife Helen Donaldson, Marter graduated from the University of Oxford in 1969 and started work at the Bristol Old Vic theatre, where he served as a stage manager in addition to acting in minor stage roles.

Doctor Who

Actor
In 1971, Marter auditioned for the regular role of Captain Mike Yates in the eighth season of Doctor Who. He was offered the part, but was unable to accept due to a prior commitment. The production team were sufficiently impressed that they kept him in mind and cast him in a supporting role in the 1973 story Carnival of Monsters, broadcast as part of the tenth season of the programme.

The following year, Marter was cast in the role of Harry Sullivan, a character developed by the production team on the basis that the incoming Fourth Doctor could be portrayed by an older actor who would not be able to handle the more physical action scenes. After 40-year-old Tom Baker was cast, such concerns were allayed and Harry was written out after only one season.

Television appearances

Carnival of Monsters (as John Andrews)
Robot (as Harry Sullivan)
The Ark in Space (as Harry Sullivan)
The Sontaran Experiment (as Harry Sullivan)
Genesis of the Daleks (as Harry Sullivan)
Revenge of the Cybermen (as Harry Sullivan)
Terror of the Zygons (as Harry Sullivan)
The Android Invasion (episodes 2–4 as an Android impersonating Harry Sullivan, episode 4 as Harry Sullivan.)

Author
Marter remained involved with Doctor Who after his departure from the regular cast. He co-wrote the script for a feature film version, provisionally titled Doctor Who Meets Scratchman (also known as Doctor Who and the Big Game), in collaboration with Baker and director James Hill; due to a lack of funding, the project was ultimately abandoned. Marter's plot concerned Baker's Doctor coming face to face with Scratchman (an ancient term for the Devil); the finale was to have been acted out on a colossal pinball table, with the holes in the table being portals to other dimensions. Eventually, in 2019, a novelization of this story by Baker and James Goss, simply titled Scratchman, was released by BBC Books, dedicated to Marter.

He later became involved with the writing of novelisations of Doctor Who TV serials for Target Books, penning nine such adaptations in the late 1970s and early 1980s. Marter's novelisations were somewhat controversial, most notably when "bastard" appeared in his novelisation of the 1967 story The Enemy of the World. The last of Marter's Doctor Who novelisations was The Rescue, which had to be completed by range editor Nigel Robinson due to Marter's unexpected death. Marter was one of a small group of Doctor Who actors to write licensed fiction based on the series.

Marter also wrote an original spin-off novel for Target, Harry Sullivan's War, featuring the return of his character, which was published in 1986 and was one of the earliest original Doctor Who-related novels to be released. Marter had been planning both a sequel to this novel and an adaptation of his unused Doctor Who Meets Scratchman script at the time of his death.

Books

 Doctor Who and the Ark in Space
 Doctor Who and the Sontaran Experiment
 Doctor Who and the Ribos Operation
 Doctor Who and the Enemy of the World
 Doctor Who - Earthshock
 Doctor Who - The Dominators
 Doctor Who - The Invasion
 Doctor Who - The Reign of Terror
 Doctor Who - The Rescue
 The Companions of Doctor Who - Harry Sullivan's War

Later career

Actor
Marter's acting career beyond Doctor Who comprised mainly roles in episodes of series such as the BBC's The Brothers (1972), Crown Court (TV series), Bergerac (1981) and Granada Television's The Return of Sherlock Holmes (1986). He also had minor roles in several films, such as Doctor Faustus (1967), The Abominable Dr. Phibes (1971), North and South, The Medusa Touch (1978), and the comedy short The Waterloo Bridge Handicap (1978). Marter lived and worked in New Zealand in the early 1980s, appearing in the soap opera Close to Home from 1982.

Author
In addition to his Doctor Who novelisations, Marter wrote adaptations of several 1980s American films such as Splash and Down and Out in Beverly Hills for Target and its imprint, Star Books. Some of these books were published under the pen name Ian Don.

Other novelizations:

Splash (as Ian Don, Touchstone, Star Books, 1984)
Baby (as Ian Don, Disney, Star Books, 1985)
My Science Project (as Ian Don, Touchstone, Target Books, 1985)
Down and Out in Beverly Hills (as Ian Marter, Touchstone, Star Books, 1986)
Tough Guys (as Ian Don, Touchstone, Star Books, 1986)

Gummi Bears Picture Books:
  
Book 1 Disney's Gummi Bears: Zummi Makes It Hot (as Ian Don, Disney, Target Books, 1986)
Book 2 Disney's Gummi Bears: Gummi In A Gilded Cage (as Ian Don, Disney, Target Books, 1986)
Book 3 Disney's Gummi Bears: The Secret of the Juice (as Ian Don, Disney, Target Books, 1986)
Book 4 Disney's Gummi Bears: Light Makes Right (as Ian Don, Disney, Target Books, 1986)

References

External links

Ian Marter at the On Target Target Books fansite

1944 births
1986 deaths
Actors from Coventry
English male film actors
English male soap opera actors
English science fiction writers
English male screenwriters
20th-century English male actors
20th-century English non-fiction writers
Alumni of Bristol Old Vic Theatre School
Alumni of the University of Oxford
British expatriate actors
British expatriates in New Zealand
Deaths from diabetes
Writers from London
20th-century English novelists
English male non-fiction writers
20th-century English screenwriters
20th-century English male writers
20th-century pseudonymous writers